

FENIARCO

Feniarco is the National Federation of the Regional Choral Associations in Italy.

Since 1984, year of its birth, it grew spreading on all the national area up to representing nowadays all the Regions. Emblem of Italian choral life, the Association gathers more than 2700 member choirs and 150.000 among singers and partners. They are volunteers that offer music and culture through thousands of concerts, festivals, courses, conferences and meetings that are organized most of all in places not practised by institutional culture.

The choral world is a widespread and free school in which there is place for musical culture and for fun, for team spirit but also for good competition. Connection between past and present, a choir joins different generations that through singing rediscover the pleasure of being together.

Federation role and activity

Update and re-launch the profile and role of the Federation.
More attention to the problems of choirs and choral life, favouring artistic and musical aspects. Take, deepen and accompany the becoming that are also of choirs' interest.
The FENIARCO is not only the big common house of all Italian choirs, but it has to become also an important "cultural subject" inside the musical and choral culture of our country: a challenging and essential way to give more dignity and a higher profile to our care and to the important role played by choirs.
On national field Feniarco promotes and coordinates different important activities such as courses, competitions, conferences, concerts and other important initiatives through the members of the Executive Council or of the Artistic Commission.

International Representation

Feniarco is the official representative of Italian choral life at the European Choral Association - Europa Cantat (ECA-EC), and at the International Federation for Choral Music (IFCM). In such character it participates to Assemblies, to Europa Cantat events and has contacts and relationships with Federations of other European Countries and continents in a frame of exchanges and mutual collaborations.

Publishing

One of the most important initiatives that Feniarco is carrying on is publishing and, strictly related to it, the research activity. Feniarco editions are already a little library, publishing new works by the leading Italian choral composers: Andrea Basevi, Piero Caraba, Giuseppe Cappotto, Giuseppe Di Bianco, Orlando Dipiazza, Sandro Filippi, Battista Pradal, Pierpaolo Scattolin, Mauro Zuccante, etc.

 Choraliter, four-month magazine of Italian choral world
 Giro giro canto vol. 1, 2 e 3, new compositions for primary and junior high schools
 Teenc@nta, collection of compositions for youth choirs
 Melos, vol. 1 e 2, a chronicle of choral music in Italy through the voice of young composers and already famous authors
 Melos, vol 3
 Il respiro è già canto (F. Corti), notes of choral directions edited by Dario Tabbia
 Feniarco Editions, collection for the valorisation of contemporary Italian composers
 Choraliter, choral anthology thought as agile instrument to enrich choirs’ repertoire
 Canto "popolare" e canto corale, 3rd Day of Studies in honour of Domenico Cieri
 "Voci & Tradizione" project, one anthology for each region with songs of oral tradition harmonized or elaborated for choir (available: Friuli Venezia Giulia, Piemonte, Tuscany)

Italian choirs
Organizations established in 1984
Italian musical groups